Neurozerra roricyanea is a moth in the family Cossidae. It was described by Francis Walker in 1862. It is found in Malaysia and New Guinea.

References

Zeuzerinae
Moths described in 1862